Zhongshan Square is a city square in the Zhongshan District of Dalian, Liaoning, China named for Sun Yat-sen (popularly known as Sun Zhongshan); originally designed and built by the Russians in the 19th century. Several classical buildings are located on the square, which were built during the first half of the 20th century by the Japanese.

History

The square was originally built in 1898 as Nikolayevskaya Square ('Nicholas II's plaza'), when the Russian Empire controlled Dalian (the then Port Arthur).

When Manchuria came under Japanese rule, it was renamed by the Japanese to 'Ōhiroba', 'the large plaza')—with the Friendship Square, then known as Nishihiroba ('west square'), being the 'small plaza'. In 1945, after the Japanese withdrawal, it was finally renamed Zhongshan Square in honor of Sun Zhongshan (Sun Yat-sen), the first president of the Republic of China.

In 1995, 36 sets of audio systems were installed at Zhongshan Square making it the first 'musical square' in China.

Design

Inside the five-lane roundabout there is a green zone and a paved area where people gather to dance on summer evenings, participate in foreign language corners, or do other activities. There are pedestrian underpasses leading to the inside of the square from both the Zhongshan and Renmin roads.

The ten roads that radiate from the square in clockwise order are:
 Shanghai Road - north
 Minsheng Street
 Qiyi Street
 Renmin Road - east
 Luxun Road
 Jiefang Street
 Yan'an Road - south
 Yuguang Street
 Zhongshan Road - west
 Minkang Street

The Renmin and Zhangshan roads make up the main east-west artery of the downtown Dalian area. East of the square is the Renmin road, passing through the hotel area toward Gangwan Square, near the Port of Dalian. West of the square is Zhongshan Road, passing through Friendship Square, Qingniwaqiao, and the City Hall, toward Lüshun.

Business center
Located at the center of Dalian's Zhongshan District, Zhongshan Square and the adjacent Zhongshan and Renmin roads are a part of Dalian's central business district.

See also
 Dalian
 Modern Buildings on Zhongshan Square in Dalian
 Central business district
 Russian Dalian

References

External links

Dalian
Squares in Dalian
Tourist attractions in Liaoning